De Musset is a French surname. Notable people with the surname include:

Alfred de Musset (1810–1857), French writer
Paul de Musset (1804–1880), French writer

French-language surnames